Go Out policy is the People's Republic of China's current strategy to encourage its enterprises to invest overseas.

Most nations favour attracting inward foreign investment, and support outward foreign investment only passively. The People's Republic of China, however, attaches importance to both inward and outward foreign investment.

Causes

 The People's Republic of China has amassed huge amounts of foreign reserves, thus putting upward pressure on the foreign exchange rate of renminbi, the Chinese currency.  Indeed, there has been much demand from the international community for the PRC to float its currency.  In order to deflate that demand, the PRC seeks to employ its foreign reserves by acquiring assets overseas.
 The PRC is opening up the domestic market in mainland China as a result of its open door policy, which is further accelerated by its commitments when entering the World Trade Organization. Therefore, the PRC can foresee that world class competitors are now competing for business in the Chinese market, and so the PRC is seeking to equip the domestic firms and their management with international experience so that they can take the competition to the home markets of the foreign nations and so that they can compete better at mainland China's own domestic market.

History
The Go Out Policy (also referred to as the Going Global Strategy) was an effort initiated in 1999 by the Chinese government to promote Chinese investments abroad. The Government, together with the China Council for the Promotion of International Trade (CCPIT), has introduced several schemes to assist domestic companies in developing a global strategy to exploit opportunities in the expanding local and international markets.

The programs launched so far by the Chinese Government have these goals in mind: 
increase Chinese Direct Foreign Investment (FDI)
pursue product diversification
improve the level and quality of the projects
expand financial channels with respect to the national market
promote brand recognition of Chinese companies in EU and US markets

Since the launching of the Going out Strategy, interest in overseas investing by Chinese companies has increased significantly especially among State Owned Enterprises.  Statistics indicate that Chinese direct foreign investments rose from US$3 billion in 1991 to US$35 billion in 2003. This trend was underscored in 2007, when Chinese FDI reached US$92 billion. This boost in foreign investment can also be attributed to the Chinese Government's ability and commitment to create the right environment for foreign investment; and China's huge production capacity, coupled with low labor costs. With a dynamic economy, and a strong business-friendly culture, the outlook for Chinese companies will continue to be positive.

As part of its efforts to restructure state-owned enterprises, the Chinese government has established the SASAC (State-Owned Asset Supervision Administration Commission), which develops China's equity exchange market, while supporting Chinese foreign investments. SASAC's responsibilities include:
supervision and evaluation of state-owned enterprises
oversight of state-owned assets
recruiting of top executive talent
drafting of laws, administrative rules and regulations that promote increased development of corporate law in China
coordination of local state-owned assets as prescribed by law
The SASAC operates through several equity exchanges such as CBEX (China Beijing Equity Exchange), which is the largest and most prestigious in terms of trading volume. It is headquartered in the heart of Beijing financial district. Presently, CBEX has established three international platforms in Italy, Japan and the United States of America. The Italian CMEX (China Milan Equity Exchange), created in 2007, is CBEX's first international partner, operating as a liaison to facilitate the penetration of Chinese companies into the Italian and European markets and of European companies in China. Following the trend of the Go out policy, some of the most prominent Chinese professional institutions are expanding their business on the international markets. King & Wood Mallesons, the largest Law Firm in China with more than 800 lawyers and lobbyists, opened branches in various cities of the United States and Japan, while Grandall Legal Group (one of the most prominent Chinese Law Firms, with a staff of more than 600 professionals) through its International Department has established a European hub called the “China-Europe Legal Group” to assist Chinese companies in legal and lobbying work operating and expanding in Europe. Carone & Partners is a member law firm of the “China-Europe Legal Group” in Italy.

Examples of the Go Out policy

Overseas SEZs 
From 1990 to 2018, Chinese enterprises established eleven SEZs in sub-Saharan Africa and the Middle East including: Nigeria (two), Zambia, Djibouti, Kenya, Mauritius, Mauritania, Egypt,  Oman, and Algeria. Generally, the Chinese government takes a hands-off approach, leaving it to Chinese enterprises to work to establish such zones (although it does provide support in the form of grants, loans, and subsidies, including support via the China Africa Development Fund). These zones fall within the Chinese policy to go out and compete globally.

The first Chinese overseas SEZs facilitated the offshoring of labor-intensive and less competitive industries, for example in textiles. As Dawn C. Murphy summarizes, these zones now "aim to transfer China's development successes to other countries, increase business opportunities for China manufacturing companies, avoid trade barriers by setting up zones in countries with preferential trade access to important markets, and create a positive business environment for Chinese small and medium-sized enterprises investing in these regions."

Agricultural enterprises in Africa 
Since the mid-1990s, China has encouraged its agricultural enterprises to seek economic opportunities abroad as part of its go out policy, including to Africa. Chinese policy guidance has specifically encouraged such efforts in rubber, oil palm, cotton, vegetable cultivation, animal husbandry, aquaculture, and assembly of agriculture machines.  The encouragement for agricultural enterprises to go out  has also resulted in the creation of Agricultural Technology Demonstration Centers in African countries. The function of these centers is to transmit agricultural expertise and technology from China to developing countries in Africa while also creating market opportunities for Chinese companies in the agricultural sector. China is motivated to establish these centers out of both an ideological commitment to fostering South-South cooperation and sharing its experience with less developed countries and by a pragmatic desire to increase its long-term food security. China first announced its Agricultural Technology Demonstrations Centers at the 2006 meeting of the Forum on China-Africa Cooperation. It launched 19 of these centers between 2006 and 2018, all in sub-Saharan Africa.

See also
 Economy of China
 Foreign policy of the People's Republic of China

References

Economic development in China
Trade in China
Chinese investment abroad